West Suffolk County Council was the county council of the non-metropolitan county of West Suffolk in east England. It came into its powers on 1 April 1889 and acted as the governing authority for the county until it was amalgamated with East Suffolk County Council to form Suffolk County Council in 1974. The county council was based at the Shire Hall Complex in Bury St Edmunds.

References

Former county councils of England
1889 establishments in England
1974 disestablishments in England
History of Suffolk